The Valea Înfundăturii is a right tributary of the river Hârtibaciu in Romania. It flows into the Hârtibaciu near Agnita.

References

Rivers of Romania
Rivers of Sibiu County